Zanzibar was the  first country in East Africa to introduce the steam locomotive. Sultan Bargash bin Said had a seven-mile railway constructed from his palace at Stone Town to Chukwani in 1879. Initially the two Pullman cars were hauled by mules but in 1881 the Sultan ordered an 0-4-0 tank locomotive from the English locomotive builders Bagnall. The railway saw service until the Sultan died in 1888 when the track and locomotive were scrapped.

Fifteen years later (In 1905) the American Company Arnold Cheyney built a seven-mile line from Zanzibar Town to the village of Bububu. It was notorious for its ability to set fire to property and the surrounding countryside but it ran for twenty-five years until it closed in 1930.

The Bububu Railway plied six or seven times a day to Zanzibar Town. The service was extremely popular and largely used by the native population. A special first-class coach was run for the benefit of those passengers from steamers who wish to obtain a glimpse of the island. The railway traversed some of the narrowest streets of the city, and it was a constant source of wonderment how passers-by escaped being run over. Europeans resident in Zanzibar regard the railway with an amused tolerance.

During the railway construction the Americans undertook the task of installing electrical power lines along the track. Wherever the rails were placed, metal poles were installed and power lines strung overhead. By 1906, long before even London obtained them, Stone Town had electric street lights. In 1911, the railway was sold to the Government, and by 1922 the passenger service ceased. As roads improved and motor vehicles on the island increased, its popularity diminished.

With the improvement of the port the railway was used for the haulage of stone which was used to reclaim the seafront. Today much of the old track bed has been built on however train enthusiasts can still see the remains of the railway’s bridges and embankments close to the main road to Bububu.

See also

History of Zanzibar
Rail transport in Tanzania
History of rail transport in Tanzania

Further reading

References

Rail transport in Tanzania
Transport in Zanzibar